Richard Steven Elman (born 21 March 1945) is an American mathematician at the University of California, Los Angeles, known for his work in algebra. He received his Ph.D. at the University of California, Berkeley in 1972, under the supervision of Tsit Yuen Lam.

He is a fellow of the American Mathematical Society. Among his collaborators are  Nikita Karpenko and Alexander Merkurjev.

Selected publications
 as editor with Murray M. Schacher and Veeravalli S. Varadarajan: 
 with Nikita Karpenko and Alexander Merkurjev:

References

External links
 Faculty page at UCLA
 Photo at MFO

1945 births
Living people
20th-century American mathematicians
21st-century American mathematicians
University of California, Los Angeles faculty
Fellows of the American Mathematical Society
UC Berkeley College of Letters and Science alumni